Redlands Primary School is a primary school in Reading, Berkshire, England.

History
The school was founded in 1891 as Redlands Board School.  Initially it consisted of just an Infant Department which catered for children aged 2 to 7, but in 1892 separate Boys and Girls Departments were opened for children aged 7 to 14.  The school buildings, which were designed by local architect S. Slingsby Stallwood, were intended to hold 1166 children, and consisted of a small block which housed the Infants and a larger two-storey block which housed the Boys upstairs and the Girls downstairs.

In 1902 the abolition of the school boards led to the school's name being changed to Redlands Council School.

During World War I, between 1915 and 1918, the school buildings were converted to No. 4 Reading War Hospital and the teachers and pupils were temporarily moved out to nearby schools.

In 1929 the three departments of the school were reorganized into just two: a Primary Department for children aged up to 11 and a Secondary Department for older children.  In 1945 these two departments were recognized as separate schools: Redlands Primary School and Redlands Secondary School.  However, in 1963 the local education authority decided that the Secondary School was too small to support and closed it.  The Primary School moved into the larger building in 1968.

References

External links
Redlands Primary School web-site
BBC Stats page for school

Educational institutions established in 1891
Primary schools in Reading, Berkshire
1891 establishments in England
Community schools in Reading, Berkshire